Philippe Rondot (5 October 1936 – 31 December 2017) was a French general, formerly an important personality of the French intelligence. He worked for both the domestic intelligence DST and the foreign intelligence DGSE (traditionally rival services) and was an aide to several Defence Ministers.

Early life
Philippe Rondot was born in Nancy in 1936. He graduated from the École Spéciale Militaire de Saint-Cyr in 1965, and he earned a PhD in political sociology.

Career
Rondot joined the "special services" in 1965 as an officer of the "action" branch of the SDECE (ancestor of the present DGSE). In the late 1970s, he joined the DST. In 1994, he was active in the capture of terrorist Ilich Ramírez Sánchez (aka "Carlos the Jackal") in Sudan. He also took part in hostage liberations in Libya and Iraq.

From 1997, he was in charge of coordinating intelligence at the Defence Ministry, until he retired on 31 December 2005. His title was "conseiller pour le renseignement et les opérations spéciales" ("advisor for intelligence and special operations") of the Defence minister, first Alain Richard and later Michèle Alliot-Marie.

Rondot became a Grand Officer of the Legion of Honour in 2006.

Second Clearstream Affair

After receiving a Clearstream listing from Jean-Louis Gergorin, Philippe Rondot directed an inquiry, following orders from the minister of Defence, and reporting to Prime Minister Dominique de Villepin directly. This caused Rondot's house to be searched in March 2006, and himself to be audited, by judges Jean-Marie d'Huy and Henri Pons.

Death
Rondot resided in a manor in Fléty, where he died on December 31, 2017, aged 81.

Works 
 La Syrie, Presses universitaires de France, Paris, 1978 .
 L'Irak, Presses universitaires de France, Paris, 1979 .
 La Jordanie, Presses universitaires de France, Paris, 1980 .
 Les projets de paix arabo-israéliens, École des hautes études en sciences sociales, Paris, 1980 (thèse universitaire).
 Le Proche-Orient à la recherche de la paix, 1973-1982, Presses universitaires de France, Paris, 1982 .
 With , Le Parti Ba'th, École des hautes études en sciences sociales, Louvain-la-Neuve, Centre de Recherches sur le monde arabe contemporain, 1984.

References

External links 
 Philippe Rondot on L'Express (31/12/2017)
 Philippe Rondot, le général de l'ombre on Le Parisien (30/04/2006)
 Affaire clearstream. Le passé roumain du général Rondot on Courrier International (10/07/2007)
 Rhilippe Rondot : mort d'une légende on Le Point (31/12/2017)
 Il ne faut pas prendre le général Rondot pour un "berniche" on L'Obs'' (11/5/2011)

1936 births
2017 deaths
Military personnel from Nancy, France
École Spéciale Militaire de Saint-Cyr alumni
French generals
French spies
Grand Officiers of the Légion d'honneur